Maria Sharapova was the defending champion, but lost in the first round to Kimiko Date-Krumm.

Caroline Wozniacki won the title, defeating Elena Dementieva in the final 1–6, 6–2, 6–3. This was to be Dementieva's last WTA singles final before her retirement later that year.

Seeds
The top eight seeds receive a bye into the second round.

Main draw

Finals

Top half

Section 1

Section 2

Bottom half

Section 3

Section 4

References
 Main Draw
 Qualifying Draw

Pan Pacific Open
Toray Pan Pacific Open - Singles
2010 Toray Pan Pacific Open